Leonid Vladimirovich Elenin (born 10 August 1981) is a Russian amateur astronomer working with the ISON-NM observatory (H15) via the International Scientific Optical Network (ISON), which is the first Russian remote observatory in the West.

Leonid Elenin works for the Keldysh Institute of Applied Mathematics and lives in Lyubertsy, Moscow region, Russia.

Leonid Elenin is best known for discovering the comet C/2010 X1 on 10 December 2010. Elenin then discovered comet P/2011 NO1 on 7 July 2011. , Elenin had discovered five comets.

The first asteroid discovered by Leonid Elenin was 2008 XE on 1 December 2008 at Tzec (H10).

Elenin has also discovered the trailing L5 Jupiter trojan  on 23 August 2011, the Mars-crossing asteroid  on 25 August 2011, and the amor asteroid (Near-Earth object)  on 27 August 2011. The first numbered asteroid discovered by Elenin at ISON-NM is 365756 ISON.

On 29 January 2013, the Minor Planet Center awarded Leonid Elenin a 2012 Edgar Wilson Award for the discovery of comets by amateurs.

References 
 

1981 births
21st-century Russian astronomers
Amateur astronomers
Discoverers of minor planets

Living people
Moscow Aviation Institute alumni